Frederick Augustus of Saxony may refer to:
Elector Augustus II the Strong (1670–1733), King of Poland and Frederick Augustus I of Saxony
Elector Augustus III the Saxon (1696–1763), King of Poland and Frederick Augustus II of Saxony
Frederick Augustus I of Saxony (1750–1827), Elector, later King of Saxony, Duke of Warsaw
Frederick Augustus II of Saxony (1797–1854), King of Saxony
Frederick Augustus III of Saxony (1865–1932), last King of Saxony
Frederick Augustus of Saxe-Eisenach (1663–1684), hereditary Prince of Saxe-Eisenach